Cosimo Cavallo (born 1 January 1951), best known as Mimmo Cavallo, is an Italian singer-songwriter and composer.

Life and career 
Born in Lizzano, Apulia, Cavallo spent his childhood in Turin, where his family had moved. At 17 years old he moved back in Apulia, where he started performing as a singer, and shortly later he moved to Rome, where he began his professional career.

In 1980, Cavallo released his first record, the concept album Siamo meridionali, which received large critical acclaim. Active as a songwriter for other artists, his collaborations include work Mia Martini, Zucchero Fornaciari, Ornella Vanoni, Gianni Morandi, Loredana Bertè and Fiorella Mannoia. He composed "Ma che storia è questa", the theme song of the RAI television program La storia d'Italia a fumetti by  Enzo Biagi.

Discography
Albums
     1980 - Siamo meridionali (CGD, 20163) 
     1981 - Uh, mammà! (CGD, 20256) 
     1982 - Stancami, stancami musica (Fonit Cetra, LPX 112) 
     1989 - Non voglio essere uno spirito (DDD, 209 993) 
     1991 - L'incantautore (DDD, 262 893) 
     2011 - Quando saremo fratelli uniti
     2014 -  Dalla parte delle bestie
     2017 - Puesta del Sol Tango

References

External links
 

 

1951 births
Living people
People from the Province of Taranto
Italian male singers
Italian singer-songwriters
Italian lyricists
Italian male composers